Symphyotrichum foliaceum (formerly Aster foliaceus) is a species of flowering plant in the family Asteraceae native to western North America. Commonly known as leafy aster, leafy-bracted aster, and alpine leafybract aster, it is a perennial, herbaceous plant that may reach  in height. Its flowers have violet to purple ray florets and yellow disk florets. Four varieties were accepted  by Plants of the World Online (POWO), as follows: S. foliaceum var. apricum, S. foliaceum var. canbyi, S. foliaceum var. cusickii, and S. foliaceum var. parryi. The autonym is S. foliaceum var. foliaceum.

Gallery

Citations

References

foliaceum
Flora of Alaska
Flora of Alberta
Flora of British Columbia
Flora of Montana
Flora of Washington (state)
Plants used in traditional Native American medicine
Plants described in 1836
Taxa named by John Lindley